The 1904 American Medical football team was an American football team that represented the American College of Medicine and Surgery of Chicago, in the 1904 college football season.

Schedule

References

American Medical
American Medical football seasons
American Medical football